Nazmi Bilge (3 December 1910 – 16 April 1989) was a Turkish football player and manager. He spent most of his career at Beşiktaş, where he was captain and achieved his greatest success.

Career
At Beşiktaş he scored a total of 158 goals in all competitions, including the Istanbul Football League, Turkish National Division, Turkish Federation Cup, and Süper Lig. He was the leading goalscorer in the 1956–57 season of the Federation Cup and is known for having scored the first goal of Beşiktaş in the Süper Lig.

Honours

Club
 Turkish Federation Cup: 1956–57, 1957–58
 Millî Lig: 1959–60

Individual
 Turkish Federation Cup top scorer: 1956–57
 Milliyet Athlete of the Year: 1959

References

External links
 
 

1934 births
2013 deaths
People from Trabzon
Turkish footballers
Altay S.K. footballers
Beşiktaş J.K. footballers
Turkey international footballers
Turkish football managers
Süper Lig players
Association football forwards
Burials at Zincirlikuyu Cemetery